Fantastic, Vol. 2 (also referred to as Fantastic Volume II) is the second album by American hip hop group Slum Village, released on June 13, 2000. During the time of its release the group was still composed of its earliest members T3, Baatin and J Dilla.

Overview 
The album was initially completed in 1998 for A&M Records shortly before the label became obsolete, leaving Slum Village in limbo for over a year.  During this period, however, the group's producer Jay Dee greatly increased his profile through work with artists such as Common, Busta Rhymes, Erykah Badu and A Tribe Called Quest. At the same time tremendous acclaim from notables such as Questlove of The Roots and Q-Tip built up anticipation for the long-delayed LP.

Slum Village eventually found an outlet with Goodvibe Recordings & Barak Records, and released Fantastic, Vol. 2 in spring 2000. Although sales were slow (due to heavy bootlegging) the group nevertheless had a huge impact on the underground circuit and were proclaimed torch-bearers for the departing A Tribe Called Quest.

In particular Jay Dee's much lauded production work, full of subtle grooves and soul claps, was a blueprint for the direction that neo soul would take in the coming years.  The album was re-released minus the original version of "Fall-N-Love", which was replaced by the remix due to sample clearance issues, as well as their collaboration with Common, "Thelonius" (which originally appeared on Common's Like Water for Chocolate). "Raise It Up" uses a sample from the song "Extra Dry" by Thomas Bangalter of Daft Punk.  It was initially used without permission, as producer J Dilla obtained a copy of the song from a bootleg recording, and assumed that the artist was an obscure producer who was unlikely to notice. Bangalter and Guy-Manuel de Homem-Christo however happened to be fans of Slum Village, and rather than demand a payment for the sample, instead asked the group to remix one of their own tracks; this ended up becoming Slum Village's remix of the song "Aerodynamic".

The album's cover was designed by Waajeed (of the group Platinum Pied Pipers).

Reaction and aftermath 

The album received highly positive reviews and acclaim upon its release. SF Weekly, for example, commented that "(Jay Dee's) production style has been subtly influencing better-recognized producers for years" and even went as far as to claim that "Slum Village is going to single-handedly save rap music". The group themselves have since acknowledged the impact this record had, and while they benefited greatly from it, it has also overshadowed their later, though more commercially successful work.

The twelfth track "Get Dis Money" was originally featured on the soundtrack to the 1999 Mike Judge cult film Office Space. The second track "Conant Gardens" was featured in the 2002 Frankie Muniz film Big Fat Liar as well as the 2003 Steve Martin film Cheaper by the Dozen.

The album was re-issued as Fantastic Vol. 2.10 in 2010.

Track listing

Original pressing
All tracks are solely produced by Jay Dee, except for "Tell Me", which is produced by D'Angelo and co-produced by Jay Dee, and "Once Upon A Time", which is produced by Pete Rock and Jay Dee. On subsequent pressings, the album includes the Jay Dee-produced songs "Thelonius" and "Who We Are" as bonus tracks. Questlove produced the preceding interlude to "Thelonius" but as the entire track is lifted from Common's Like Water For Chocolate, he is not credited.

All songs written by James Yancey, Titus Glover and R. L. Altman, except as noted

 "Intro"  – 1:25
 "Conant Gardens"  – 3:04
 "I Don't Know"  – 2:25
 "Jealousy" – 4:05
 "Climax (Girl Shit)"  – 3:31
 "Hold Tight" (feat. Q-Tip)  (James Yancey, Titus Glover, R.L. Altman, Kamaal Fareed) – 3:12
 "Tell Me" (feat. D'Angelo) (James Yancey, Titus Glover, R.L. Altman, Michael Archer) – 4:37
 "What It's All About" (feat. Busta Rhymes) (James Yancey, Titus Glover, R.L. Altman, Trevor Smith) – 3:36
 "Forth and Back" (feat. Kurupt) (James Yancey, Titus Glover, R.L. Altman, Ricardo Brown) – 4:26
 "Untitled/Fantastic"  – 3:54
 "Fall in Love"  - 3:47
 "Get Dis Money"  – 3:31
 "Raise It Up"  – 4:27
 "CB4"  – 3:45
 "Once Upon a Time" (feat. Pete Rock) (James Yancey, Titus Glover, R.L. Altman, Peter Phillips) – 5:54
 "Players"  – 2:26
 "Eyes Up"  – 4:22
 "2U 4U"  – 3:08
 "Go Ladies"  – 4:43
 "Thelonius" (feat. Common) (James Yancey, Titus Glover, R.L. Altman, Lonnie Lynn) - 4:29 (Hidden track)
 "Who Are We" - 3:44 (bonus track found on later pressings)

2010 re-release
On February 2, 2010, the album was re-released as the two-disc Fantastic Vol. 2.10, commemorating the 10th anniversary of the original album. This Barak Records release features additional tracks, alternative versions of a few songs, instrumentals, and a different intro from the original release. The songs changed or replaced are "Hold Tight", "Fourth & Back", "Once Upon a Time" and "2U 4U". This version of "Once Upon a Time" is produced by Pete Rock only. "Climax", while the same version of the song, now features a different ending followed by a skit. "Fall-N-Love" is listed as the 'original version' but is the same version to be found on the original release, this is because of some earlier presses that replaced it with the 12" remixes because of a sample problem. It is notable for including many small skits that appear between songs that never appeared on earlier presses.

Disc 1:
 "Intro"
 "Conant Gardens"
 "I Don't Know" (feat. Jazzy Jeff)
 "Skit #1"
 "Jealousy"
 "Climax"
 "Hold Tight (Remix)" (feat. Q-Tip)
 "Tell Me"
 "Skit #2"
 "Forth & Back (Original Version)" (feat. Kurupt)
 "Untitled"
 "Fall-N-Love (Original Version)"
 "Get Dis Money"
 "CB4"
 "Once Upon a Time (Pete Rock Remix)" (feat. Pete Rock)
 "Players"
 "Eyes Up"
 "2U 4U [Live Drums]"
 "Hustle" (feat. Busta Rhymes)
 "Go Ladies"
 "Skit #3"
 "We Be Dem #1"
 "We Be Dem #2"
 "Get It Together"

Disc 2:
 "Conant Gardens (Instrumental)"
 "I Don't Know (Instrumental)"
 "Climax (Instrumental)"
 "Hold Tight (Remix) (Instrumental)"
 "Tell Me (Instrumental)"
 "Untitled (Instrumental)"
 "Fall-N-Love (Instrumental)"
 "Get Dis Money (Instrumental)"
 "CB4 (Instrumental)"
 "Players (Instrumental)"
 "Eyes Up (Instrumental)"
 "2U 4U (Instrumental)"
 "Hustle (Instrumental)"
 "Go Ladies (Instrumental)"

Outtakes 
"Once Upon A Time" - was originally titled "On A Mission", and was on a white label before the album's release. This version is also produced by Pete Rock, but without Jay Dee's added touches.
"Get Dis Money" - a version with an alternative verse from Baatin.
"The Hustle" (Ft. Busta Rhymes) - white label.
"Beej N Dem" - one of the many tracks from Slum's demo debut "Fantastic" that was re-recorded for Volume 2, this was the last and most high-end cut of this song that was released.
"Forth & Back" - the second of three recordings for "Forth & Back", another song concept from "Fantastic", this version uses a more radio-friendly beat, sampling Tom Browne's "Funkin' for Jamaica (N.Y.)". The order of verses remains intact, including the feature from Kurupt, except Jay, T3, and Baatin's verses are all older vocal takes with completely different lyrics.
"2U4U" - a version with drums by Jay Dee & Karriem Riggins.

All of these outtakes are on the re-release of the album.

References

External links

2000 albums
J Dilla albums
Slum Village albums
Albums produced by J Dilla
Albums produced by Pete Rock
Albums produced by Questlove
Sequel albums